is a junction passenger railway station located in the city of Tokorozawa, Saitama, Japan, operated by the private railway operator Seibu Railway.

Lines

All train services stop at this station.

Station layout

The station consists of one side platform and two island platforms serving five tracks.

Platforms

History

The station opened on 21 March 1895. The station building was rebuilt in 2012, with the new station building opened on 8 March 2012. The former west entrance closed from this date.

Station numbering was introduced on all Seibu Railway lines during fiscal 2012, with Tokorozawa Station becoming "SS22" on the Seibu Shinjuku Line and "SI17" on the Seibu Ikebukuro Line.

Passenger statistics
In fiscal 2019, the station was the 7th busiest on the Seibu network with an average of 102,368 passengers daily.  The passenger figures for previous years are as shown below.

Surrounding area

East exit
 Seibu Holdings head office
 Seibu Bus head office

South/West exit
 Seibu Railway Workshops (closed)

A Grand Emio was built around Tokorozawa Station. It is composed of around 120 stores. It was completed on September 2, 2020.

See also
 List of railway stations in Japan

References

External links

  

Railway stations in Saitama Prefecture
Railway stations in Japan opened in 1895
Seibu Ikebukuro Line
Railway stations in Tokorozawa, Saitama